{{Speciesbox
| image = Metridium dianthus.jpg
| taxon = Metridium dianthus
| authority = (Ellis, 1768)
| synonyms = *Actinia aurantiaca Jordan, 1855
Actinia dianthus Ellis, 1768
Actinia felina Linnaeus, 1767
Actinia marginata Le Sueur, 1817
Actinia pentapetala Pennant
Actinia plumosaActiniloba dianthus de Blainville, 1830Cribrina plumosa EhrenbergMetridium fimbriatum Verrill, 1865Metridium marginatum Milne-EdwardsMetridium plumosa
Sagartia dianthus
| synonyms_ref = 
}}Metridium dianthus is a species of sea anemone in the family Metridiidae. It is found in the northern Atlantic Ocean (including the coasts of the British Isles) and in the northeast Pacific Ocean. There is also a record from South Africa, possible resulting from an introduction.

Description
This is the largest sea anemone in the northeastern Atlantic; the smooth column can be  in height with a pedal disc wider than this.

Distribution and habitatMetridium dianthus is an adaptable, circumboreal species in the Northern Hemisphere. In the eastern Atlantic, its range extends from the Kola Peninsula in northern Russia to the Bay of Biscay, in the western Atlantic from the Arctic Circle to Delaware, and it also occurs in the northeastern Pacific. It is also present in certain locations where it has probably been introduced, including Patagonia, the Falkland Islands, South Africa and Japan.

EcologyMetridium dianthus'' is a suspension feeder, spreading its plume of tentacles and catching small organisms as they float past. These include the eggs and larvae of molluscs, polychaetes, ascidians, amphipods, copepods, barnacles, shrimps and other crustaceans, as well as foraminifera and diatoms. When there is either too strong a current, or very little water movement, it can retract both the plume of tentacles and the column.

The sexes are separate in this species and, in Scotland, spawning takes place in June and July. Batches of eggs are emitted by the female at intervals of two to ten days, not through the siphonoglyphs, as might be expected, but through slits in the body wall known as cinclides. The eggs sink to the seabed and are fertilised in the water column. The planula larvae are planktonic, before sinking to the seabed and undergoing metamorphosis into juveniles.

References

Metridiidae
Cnidarians of the Atlantic Ocean
Cnidarians of the Pacific Ocean
Animals described in 1768